The 2008 New Mexico State Aggies football team represented New Mexico State University as members of the Western Athletic Conference (WAC) in the 2008 NCAA Division I FBS football season. The Aggies were led by fourth year head coach Hal Mumme who was fired after the end of the season and played their home games at Aggie Memorial Stadium. They finished the season 3–9 overall and 1–7 in WAC play to tied for eighth place.

Schedule

References

New Mexico State
New Mexico State Aggies football seasons
New Mexico State Aggies football